Tadavas is  a village in Jaipur district, Rajasthan, India. It is famous for the Lord Narasimha temple (Shri Narsingh, Bhagwan Mandir). Narsingh Leela is organised in this village annually in the month of Vaishakha on Narsingh Chaturdashi (in April–May). 

Villages in Jaipur district